The Province of Zara was a province of the Kingdom of Italy, officially from 1918 to 1947. In 1941 it was enlarged and made part of the Italian Governorate of Dalmatia, during World War II, until 1943.

Historical background
In 1915 Italy entered World War I under the provisions set in the Treaty of London. In exchange for its participation with the Triple Entente and in the event of victory, Italy was to obtain Austro-Hungarian territory in northern Dalmatia, including Zara, Sebenico and most of the Dalmatian islands. At the end of the war, Italian military forces invaded Dalmatia and seized control of Zara, with Admiral Enrico Millo being proclaimed the "Governor of Dalmatia". Famous Italian nationalist Gabriele d'Annunzio supported the seizure of Dalmatia, and proceeded to Zara in an Italian warship in December 1918.

During 1918, political life in Zara intensified. The dissolution of Austria-Hungary led to the renewal of national conflicts in the city. With the arrival of the Royal Italian Army in the city on 4 November 1918, the Italian faction (that was the huge majority in the city) gradually assumed control, a process which was completed on 5 December when it took over the governorship. With the Treaty of Versailles (28 June 1919) Italian claims on Dalmatia contained in the Treaty of London were nullified, but later on the agreements between Italy and the Kingdom of Serbs, Croats and Slovenes (later Kingdom of Yugoslavia) set in the Treaty of Rapallo (12 November 1920) gave Zara with other small local territories to Italy. 

The territory was organized into a small Italian province.

World War II 
Fascist Italy, and other Axis powers, invaded the Kingdom of Yugoslavia on April 6, 1941. Zara held a force of 9,000 Italian army soldiers and was one of the starting points of the invasion. The force under the command of General Vittorio Ambrosio defeated easily the Royal Yugoslav Army in crisis and reached in a few days Sebenico and Spalato on April 15 (2 days before Yugoslavian surrender). Civilians were previously evacuated to Ancona and Pola. Occupying Mostar and Dubrovnik (Ragusa in Italian), on April 17 they met Italian troops that had started out from Italian Albania.

Within a few weeks, Benito Mussolini required the newly formed puppet-state, the so-called Independent State of Croatia (NDH) to hand over almost all of Dalmatia (including Spalato/Split) to fascist Italy under the Rome Treaties. The city became the center of a new Italian administrative territorial entity, called Governorate of Dalmatia, that included the enlarged Province of Zara, the new Province of Spalato, and the new Province of Cattaro. Under Italian Fascist reign, at the end of 1941 the Slavic population was subjected to a policy of forced Italianization (related to the history of Venetian Dalmatia). Many public works were done, like new hospitals and sewages. The Province of Zara in 1942 had a population of 211,900 inhabitants and an area of 3,179 km2.

After Mussolini was removed from power on 25 July 1943 and arrested, the government of Pietro Badoglio signed an armistice with the Allies on 3 September 1943, which was made public only on 8 September 1943, and the Italian army collapsed. However, just four days later on 12 September 1943, "Il Duce", was rescued by a German military raid from his secret prison on the Gran Sasso mountain, and formed the Nazi-puppet Italian Social Republic in the north of the country. The NDH proclaimed the Rome Treaties to be void and occupied Dalmatia with German support. The Germans entered Zara first, and on September 10 the German 114th Jäger Division took over.

The city was prevented from joining the NDH on the grounds that Zara itself was not subject to the conditions of the Rome Treaties. Despite this, the NDH's leader Ante Pavelić designated  as the capital of Sidraga-Ravni Kotari (one of the counties of the NDH), although its administrator was prevented from entering the city by the Italian authorities of the city. Zara remained under the local administration of the Italian Social Republic. Zara was bombed by the Allies, with serious civilian casualties. Many died in the carpet bombings, and many landmarks and centuries old works of art were destroyed. A significant number of civilians fled the city.

In late October 1944 the German army and most of the Italian civilian administration abandoned the city. On October 31, 1944, the Partisans seized the city, until then an official part of Mussolini's Italian Social Republic. At the start of World War II, Zadar had a population of 24,000 (nearly all Dalmatian Italians) but, by the end of 1944, this had decreased to 6,000. Formally, the city remained under Italian sovereignty until September 15, 1947 (Paris Peace Treaty).

After World War II's end, the "Libero comune di Zara in esilio" (Free city of Zara in exile) was created by the exiled Italians of Zara, as a follow-up of the Province of Zara.

The Italian exodus from the city continued and in a few years was almost total. The last stroke to the Italian presence was made by the local administration in October 1953, when the last Italian schools were closed and the students forced to move, in one day, into Yugoslavian schools, putting an end to the Romance identity of the city. Today the Italian community counts only a few hundred people, gathered into a local community (Comunità degli Italiani di Zara).

Municipalities

Before World War II there only a few localities in the province of Zara, like Boccagnazzo/Bokanjac and Borgo Erizzo/Arbanasi. But with the enlargement in 1941 the number grew to 20 (first in Italian the official name and then in Croatian the actual)::
Bencovazzo / Benkovac: 2,000 inhabitants.
Bosavia or Bosava / Božava: 1,520 inhabitants (with Berbigno, Sauro, Sestrugno and Zaglava)
Chistagne / Kistanje: 2,000 inhabitants
Eso Grande / Iž Veliki (Iž Veli): 1,300 inhabitants
Nona / Nin: 4,650 inhabitants (with Brevilacqua, Peterzane, Pogliazza, Puntadura, Rasanze, Verchè and Zatton)
Novegradi / Novigrad: 5,217 inhabitants (with Castel Venier and Possedaria)
Obbrovazzo / Obrovac: 1,400 inhabitants (with Ortopula)
Oltre / Preko: 7,560 inhabitants (with Cuclizza, Neviane, Pasman, S. Eufemia, Tuconio and Ugliano)
Sale / Sali: 2,090 inhabitants (with S. Stefano e Sman)
Scardona / Skradin: 2,000 inhabitants
Sebenico / Šibenik: 37,854 inhabitants (with Castell'Andreise and Zablacchie)
Selve / Silba: 4,229 inhabitants (with Isto, Melada, Premuda and Ulbo)
Stancovazzo / Stankovići: 1,000 inhabitants
Stretto / Tijesno: 7,190 inhabitants (with Bettina, Gessera, Morter and Slosella)
Timeto di Zara / Smilčić: 1,000 inhabitants
Vodizze / Vodice: 7,500 inhabitants (with Crappano, Provicchio and Zatton)
Zara / Zadar: 25,000 inhabitants
Zaravecchia / Biograd: 2,520 inhabitants
Zemonico / Zemunik Donji: 1,000 inhabitants
Zlarino / Zlarin: 3,550 inhabitants (with Capri and Zuri)

The municipality-island of Lagosta/Lastovo was transferred to the Province of Spalato.

List of prefects of the Province of Zara (1918–44)

See also
 Governorate of Dalmatia
 History of Dalmatia
 Dalmatian Italians
 Bombing of Zadar in World War II

Notes and references

Notes

References 

Zara
States and territories established in 1920
States and territories disestablished in 1947
20th century in Italy
History of Dalmatia
Italy–Yugoslavia relations
Yugoslavia in World War II
Adriatic question